The American Society for Microbiology (ASM), originally the Society of American Bacteriologists, is a professional organization for scientists who study viruses, bacteria, fungi, algae, and protozoa as well as other aspects of microbiology. It was founded in 1899. The Society publishes a variety of scientific journals, textbooks, and other educational materials related to microbiology and infectious diseases. ASM organizes annual meetings, as well as workshops and professional development opportunities for its members.

History
ASM was founded in 1899 under the name the "Society of American Bacteriologists." In December 1960, it was renamed the "American Society for Microbiology."

Mission
ASM's mission is "to promote and advance the microbial sciences." The society seeks to accomplish this mission through:

 Publishing highly cited publications
 Running multi-disciplinary meetings
 Deploying resources and expertise around the world
 Advocating for scientific research
 Fostering a deeper public understanding of microbiology

Membership
ASM has more than 30,000 members, including researchers, educators and health professionals. Membership is open to all and is offered at a discounted rate to students, postdoctoral fellows and emeritus faculty. Members pay annual dues to support the activities of ASM. ASM's newest Clinical Lab Scientist membership category was established in 2019.

ASM provides professional development opportunities and supports microbiology professionals through 60 fellowships and 300 travel awards, webinars, conferences, workshops, networking opportunities, continuing education and honorific awards.

Meetings

ASM hosts meetings and conferences, including the annual meeting ASM Microbe, that provide forums to explore microbiology topics.

ASM Microbe, a combination of what was formerly the ASM General Meeting and the Interscience Conference on Antimicrobial Agents and Chemotherapy, includes sessions in eight specialty tracks:

 Antimicrobial Agents and Resistance
 Applied and Environmental Science
 Clinical Infections and Vaccines
 Clinical and Public Health Microbiology
 Ecology, Evolution and Biodiversity
 Host-Microbe Biology
 Molecular Biology and Physiology
 Profession of Microbiology

Other ASM meetings and conferences cater to narrower audiences, including: ASM Biothreats (formerly ASM Biodefense and Emerging Diseases Research) which focuses on biodefense and emerging diseases, the Clinical Virology Symposium which focuses on viral infections, the Conference for Undergraduate Educators which focuses on biology education at the undergraduate level and the Annual Biomedical Research Conference for Minority Students which highlights microbiology research from underrepresented populations.

Publications

ASM publishes 18 journals. ASM accepts format-neutral submissions for all primary research journals since 2018. ASM's open-access journals are:

mBio
mSphere
mSystems
Journal of Microbiology & Biology Education

Other ASM journals include:

Antimicrobial Agents and Chemotherapy
Applied and Environmental Microbiology
Clinical and Vaccine Immunology
Clinical Microbiology Reviews
EcoSal Plus
Eukaryotic Cell
Microbiology Resource Announcements
Infection and Immunity
Journal of Bacteriology
Journal of Clinical Microbiology
Journal of Virology
Microbiology and Molecular Biology Reviews
Microbiology Spectrum
Molecular and Cellular Biology

The society also publishes Microcosm, a quarterly news magazine for members. Through its publishing arm ASM Press, the society publishes books covering diverse topics. Wiley is co-publisher and distributor of the ASM Press books and ebooks.

American Academy of Microbiology

The  American Academy of Microbiology (AAM) is the honorific leadership group within the ASM.  Members of the AAM are elected through an annual peer-reviewed process based on their records of scientific achievements that have advanced microbiology. The academy administers ASM scientific achievement awards that honor important contributions to basic and applied research, microbiology education, and scientific and professional leadership.

Public outreach

ASM promotes a public understanding of microbiology through science festivals, public outreach campaigns and museum exhibits. ASM engages the science-interested public and microbiologists through articles reaching nearly 25,000 readers per month, 9 podcasts with 1.5 million downloads and close to half a million social media followers.

ASM produces eight podcasts, including This Week in Microbiology, This Week in Virology, and This Week in Parasitism, hosted by Vincent Racaniello. Mundo de los Microbios hosted by Gary Toranzos, is ASM's weekly Spanish-language podcast. Meet the Microbiologist is a podcast hosted by Julie Wolf, Ph.D., that showcases the people behind the scientific discoveries in various cutting-edge areas of the microbial sciences.

Advocacy 
ASM empowers members to advocate for the highest standards in scientific practice and provides members opportunities to advocate for evidence-based scientific policy.

In 2011, ASM made a concerted effort to address the lack of visibility of its policy arm, specifically in promoting the interests of clinical microbiologists. The Public and Scientific Affairs Board Professional Affairs Committee and Committee on Laboratory Practices was active in influencing policy decisions through Congress, the Clinical Laboratory Coalition, the FDA, and the CDC.

ASM restructured its advocacy program to enhance its effectiveness in Washington, D.C., and its expansion to the Branches and various local communities. In 2018, ASM engaged members of Congress and issued statements in conjunction with Congressional hearings focusing on recent outbreaks of vaccine-preventable diseases like the measles. In 2017 and 2018, ASM played a leading role, working with coalition partners, to raise the federal budget caps and advance funding for science and public health agencies like the National Institutes of Health, National Science Foundation, National Institute for Food and Agriculture at the USDA and the Centers for Disease Control and Prevention. ASM members sent nearly 2,000 messages to Members of Congress in support of increased science funding. Noteworthy is the appreciation of ASM by CDC, since raising the caps made specifically possible the construction of the new biocontainment lab.

In 2018, ASM advocated successfully for establishing PACCARB (President's Advisory Council for Combatting Antibiotic Resistance Bacteria) into the law (from an Obama administration Executive Order), by including language in the Pandemic and All-Hazards Preparedness and Advancing Innovation Act. ASM convened a meeting with more than 20 stakeholder groups to discuss a collective path forward for federally-focused advocacy in support of microbiome research.

See also
Microbial art
MicrobeLibrary
Society for General Microbiology

References

External links

Clinical Microbiology Portal
MicrobeWorld

Microbiology organizations
Organizations established in 1899
Learned societies of the United States
Biology societies
Applied microbiology
1899 establishments in the United States